CHIMEI Corporation (CMC) is a Taiwan-based performance materials company. It has long been known as the world’s largest vendor of ABS resins. It has factories in Tainan, Zhenjiang and Zhangzhou. It also produces advanced polymer materials, synthetic rubbers, and specialty chemicals. 

CHIMEI Corporation is part of a privately held holding company called the CHIMEI Group, which has numerous subsidiaries. One of them is Chi Mei Optoelectronics (CMO), which was founded in 1997 as a subsidiary of Chi Mei Corporation.  Chi Mei Group was the largest shareholder in publicly listed CMO. The new Chimei Innolux Corporation (CMI) is the world's No. 2 and Taiwan's No. 1 largest maker of TFT-LCD panels and the likely owner of Westinghouse Digital Electronics. Though CEO Douglas Woo has maintained the confidentiality of the ownership of the private Westinghouse licensee, they admit a significant vertically integrated relationship exists between the two. CHIMEI has sold Innolux shares, stake in Innolux has fallen to 0.83 percent in Oct. 2021.  

CHIMEI has a partnership with Mitsubishi Chemical Corporation of Japan.

History
The company was founded by Shi Wen-long in 1960 as Chi Mei Industrial Company Ltd., the first acrylic sheet manufacturer in Taiwan; it was renamed CHIMEI Corporation in 1992.

In 2001, the CHIMEI Group along with IBM Japan set up International Display Technology, which it subsequently sold to Sony in 2005. In 2010, CHIMEI Optoelectronics, then a subsidiary of CHIMEI Corporation, pleaded guilty to a price fixing conspiracy with respect to sales of TFT-LCDs between 2001 and 2006.

See also
 Chi Mei Museum
 List of companies of Taiwan

References

External links

 CHIMEI Corporation
 CHIMEI Museum
 CHIMEI Medical Center

1960 establishments in Taiwan
Companies based in Tainan
Electronics companies of Taiwan
Electronics companies established in 1960
Manufacturing companies of Taiwan
Non-renewable resource companies established in 1960
Plastics companies of Taiwan
Chemical companies established in 1960